Leonard Fairclough (1853–1927) was a stonemason who founded Leonard Fairclough & Son which later merged with William Press Group to become AMEC, one of the United Kingdom's largest engineering businesses.

Career
Fairclough was born in 1853 in Adlington, Lancashire. He apprenticed locally and duly qualified as a stonemason. He set up in business on his own in 1883, initially carving funeral monuments. He subsequently brought his son, Leonard Miller Fairclough, into the business which was renamed Leonard Fairclough & Son. They gradually moved into general contracting building their first bridge in 1905.

Leonard Fairclough Senior was Chairman of the business until he died in 1927.

References

1853 births
1927 deaths
People from Adlington, Lancashire